There were 795 million undernourished people in the world in 2014, a decrease of 216 million since 1990, despite the fact that the world already produces enough food to feed everyone—7 billion people—and could feed more than that—12 billion people.

Reducing malnutrition is key part of Sustainable Development Goal 2, "Zero hunger", with a malnutrition target alongside reducing under nutrition and  stunted child growth. Because of the Sustainable Development Goals, various UN agencies are responsible for measuring and coordinating action to reduce malnutrtion. According to the World Food Programme, 135 million suffer from acute hunger, largely due to manmade conflicts, climate changes, and economic downturns. COVID-19 could double the number of people at risk of suffering acute hunger by the end of 2020.

By country 
The number of undernourished people (million) in 2010–2012 and 2014–2016 (projected).
According to the UN Food and Agriculture Organization (FAO), these countries had 5 million or more undernourished people in 2001–2003 and in 2005–2007.

Note: This table measures "undernourishment", as defined by the FAO, and represents the number of people consuming (on average for years 2010 to 2012) less than the minimum amount of food energy (measured in kilocalories per capita per day) necessary for the average person to stay in good health while performing light physical activity. It is a conservative indicator that does not take into account the extra needs of people performing extraneous physical activity, nor seasonal variations in food consumption or other sources of variability such as inter-individual differences in energy requirements. Malnutrition and undernourishment are cumulative or average situations, and not the work of a single day's food intake (or lack thereof). This table does not represent the number of people who "went to bed hungry today."

The below is a list of countries by percentage of population with undernourishment, as defined by the United Nations World Food Programme and the FAO in its "The State of Food Insecurity in the World" 2009 report.

Source: FAO: The State of Food Insecurity in the World 2009
Source: FAO Statistics Division
Source: Nations World Food Programme - World Hunger Map
Source: World Bank: Prevalence of undernourishment (% of population)

Middle East
Malnutrition rates in Iraq had risen from 19% before the US-led invasion to a national average of 28% four years later.  By 2010, according to the UN Food and Agriculture Organization, only 8% were malnourished. (See data above.)

South Asia 
According to the Global Hunger Index, South Asia (also known as the Indian Subcontinent) has the highest child malnutrition rate of world's regions. India, a largely vegetarian country and second largest country in the world by population, contributes most number in malnutrition in the region. The 2006 report mentioned that "the low status of women in South Asian countries and their lack of nutritional knowledge are important determinants of high prevalence of underweight children in the region" and was concerned that South Asia has "inadequate feeding and caring practices for young children".

30% children of India are underweight, one of the highest rates in the world and nearly double the rate of Sub-Saharan Africa.

Research on overcoming persistent under-nutrition published by the Institute of Development Studies, argues that the co-existence of India as an 'economic powerhouse' and home to one-third of the world's under-nourished children reflects a failure of the governance of nutrition: "A poor capacity to deliver the right services at the right time to the right populations, an inability to respond to citizens' needs and weak accountability are all features of weak nutrition governance." The research suggests that to make under-nutrition history in India the governance of nutrition needs to be strengthened and new research needs to focus on the politics and governance of nutrition. At the current rate of progress the MDG1 target for nutrition will only be reached in 2042 with severe consequences for human wellbeing and economic growth.

United States

According to the United States Department of Agriculture in 2015, 50 million Americans experienced food insecurity in 2009, including 17 million children. This represents nearly one in four American children.

Although the United States Department of Agriculture reported in 2012 that an estimated 85.5 percent of households in the country are food secure, millions of people in America struggle with the threat of hunger or experience hunger on a daily basis. The USDA defines food security as the economic condition of a household wherein which there is reliable access to a sufficient amount of food so all household members can lead a healthy productive life. Hunger is most commonly related to poverty since a lack of food helps perpetuate the cycle of poverty. Most obviously, when individuals live in poverty they lack the financial resources to purchase food or pay for unexpected events, such as a medical emergency. When such emergencies arise, families are forced to cut back on food spending so they can meet the financial demands of the unexpected emergency. There is not one single cause of hunger but rather a complex interconnected web of various factors. Some of the most vulnerable populations to hunger are the elderly, children, people from a low socioeconomic status, and minority groups; however, hunger's impact is not limited to these individuals.

The largest nonprofit food relief organization in the United States, Feeding America, feeds 46.5 million citizens a year to address the nation's food insecurity issue. This equates to one in seven Americans requiring their aid in a given year. An organization that focuses on providing food for the elderly population is Meals on Wheels, which is a nonprofit that delivers meals to seniors' homes. The government also works towards providing relief through programs such as the Supplemental Nutrition Assistance Program (SNAP) which was formerly known to the public as Food Stamps. Another well known government program is the National School Lunch Program (NSLP) which provides free or reduced lunches to students who qualify for the program.

The number of Americans suffering from hunger rose after the 2008 financial crisis, with children and working adults now making up a large proportion of those affected. In 2012, Gleaners Indiana Food bank reported that there were now 50 million Americans struggling with food insecurity (about 1 in 6 of the population), and that the number of folks seeking help from food banks had increased by 46% since 2005. According to a 2012 study by UCLA Center for Health Policy Research, even married couples who both work but have low incomes sometimes require the aid of food banks.

Childhood malnutrition is generally thought of as being limited to developing countries, but although most malnutrition occurs there, it is also an ongoing presence in developed nations. For example, in the United States of America, one out of every six children is at risk of hunger. A study, based on 2005–2007 data from the U.S. Census Bureau and the Agriculture Department, shows that an estimated 3.5 million children under the age of five are at risk of hunger in the United States.

In developed countries, this persistent hunger problem is not due to lack of food or food programs, but is largely due to an underutilization of existing programs designed to address the issue, such as food stamps or school meals. Many citizens of rich countries such as the United States of America attach stigmas to food programs or otherwise discourage their use. In the USA, only 60% of those eligible for the food stamp program actually receive benefits.

The U.S. Department of Agriculture reported that in 2003, 1 out of 200 U.S. households with children were so severely food insecure that any of the children went hungry at least once during the year. A substantially larger proportion of these same households (3.8 percent) had adult members who were hungry at least one day during the year because of their households' inability to afford enough food.

Africa 
According to World Vision there are 257 million people in Africa who are experiencing malnutrition. This is around 20% of the entire population of Africa. The regions in Africa with the highest rates of malnutrition are the Sub-Saharan region and parts of southern Africa. In the Sub-Saharan region, the countries that have the highest rates include, but are not limited to South Sudan, Sudan, Central African Republic, and Chad. In this region there are 237 million people who are experiencing hunger and according to Action Against Hunger, there are 319 million people without a reliable source of drinking water. In the Southern region of Africa, the countries that have the highest rates include, but are not limited to Mozambique, Zimbabwe, Zambia, and Angola. In this region there are 41 million people who are food insecure and 9 million who are in a food crisis and need immediate assistance with food.

There are many factors that contribute to malnutrition in Africa. There are environmental factors such as degradation of land and unexpected weather changes. The changes in weather such as droughts and storms, impact their food and water supply. Another factor that contributes to malnutrition is conflict. Conflict can lead to uncertainty in resources, which puts them at a higher risk of malnutrition. In addition, the areas in Africa with the highest rates of malnutrition also experience poverty which impact and limit the supply of food and necessary services. For example, some experience limited access to health services, sanitation, clean water, consistent food supply. Not only do these things directly contribute to malnutrition, but they can also lead to illnesses such as malaria and water-borne disease.

References

Malnutrition
Malnutrition